The governor of Campeche, officially Constitutional Governor of the Free and Sovereign State of Campeche, is in charge the Executive branch of the State Government.

Term
Governors are elected to serve for 6 years and they can not hold the title under any circumstance ever again. The governor takes office on the 15th day of September of the same electoral year and ends on September 14 six years after.

List of Governors 
According to the historical records of the State, the following is the list of individuals who have held the office of governor since statehood:

Nineteenth century

Twentieth century

Twenty-first century

See also 
 Congress of Campeche
2019 in Mexico

References

Campeche